Evening Hymns is a Canadian indie folk rock band, whose core member is singer and songwriter Jonas Bonnetta. The remainder of the band consists of a rotating collective of musicians, including members of Ohbijou, The Wooden Sky, The Burning Hell, The D'Urbervilles and Forest City Lovers.

History
A native of Orono, Ontario, Bonnetta released a solo recording, Farewell to Harmony, under his own name in 2007 before choosing the name Evening Hymns.  The first release under the Evening Hymns name was Spirit Guides in 2009 on indie record label Out Of This Spark and Kütu Folk Records in France. The album's songs were mainly sad and reflective. Their 2012 studio album  Spectral Dusk  featured Sylvie Smith.

After a period of touring, to support the album, Bonnetta spent time writing songs, and then Evening Hymns signed to Outside Music in June 2015. This led to the recording of the album Quiet Energies, released in September, 2015 in Canada and the United States, as well as on Kütu Folk Records in France.

He composed the music for Ryan Noth's 2021 film Drifting Snow, in which he also had his first acting role.

Discography

Albums
 Farewell to Harmony (2007)
 Spirit Guides (2009)
 Spectral Dusk (2012)
 Quiet Energies (2015)
 Heavy Nights (2020)

EPs
 Let's All Get Happy Together (2007)

Singles
 I Can Only Be Good (2020)

Contributions
 Friends in Bellwoods, "French Toast" (2007)
 Friends in Bellwoods II, "Cedars" (2009)

Track appearances
"You and Jake", from the 2009 album Spectral Dusk, is briefly featured in the 2015 movie Aloha (2015 film).

See also

Music of Canada
Canadian rock
List of Canadian musicians
:Category:Canadian musical groups

References

External links
 Evening Hymns

Musical groups established in 2007
Canadian indie rock groups
Canadian folk rock groups
Musical collectives
Musical groups from Toronto
2007 establishments in Ontario
Canadian indie folk groups